Hajj Hossein Malek (1873 in Tehran – 1973 in Tehran) was an Iranian philanthropist.

Malek was born of a Georgian mother and a Tabrizi father. He was the son of Hadj Mohammad Kazem Malek-ol-Tojjar, (the king of all merchants) a title given to his father by Nasser ed Din Shah due to his importance as a 'tâjer" in the commerce in Tabriz and also between Iran and Russia. His father also constructed the first road from Astara to Moscow.

Malek studied Persian and Arabic under the tutelage of Sheikh Massih Taleghani and later Mirza Abolhassan Jelveh, the most prominent scholars of the period. From a very early age he became interested in books and fascinated by literature, history, Islamic law and religion as well as numismatics and art.

He was fascinated by rare books and started collecting from a very early age. This interest led to the creation of an incredible collection of manuscripts and printed books.  It eventually became the Malek National Library and Museum, one of the most important cultural institutions in the Middle East.  The library holds a notable collection of over 20,000 and 42000 volumes of printed books from early the Islamic period to the present. Mr Malek was also interested in other media and collected paintings, prints, farmans and decrees, penboxes, lacquer, metalwork, coins, stamps, carpets and textiles.

Malek built hospitals, orphanages and schools for the people of Khorasan. An enormous amount of agricultural land, property and wealth was given as waqf in 1937 to the shrine of Imam Reza in Mashad, the Astan e Qods e Razavi. This was mainly for the upkeep and the development of the collection and the museum which was to remain under his supervision until his death in 1973 and then to pass on to the Astan e Qods for public use. His waqf is considered the most important in Iran in size, value and importance. Where other waqfs were devoted to mosques or religious institutions his was devoted to education and art. Despite his amazing wealth he is more known for his considerable philanthropy.

Before his passing he asked his daughters to keep watch over the museum, a few of whom are still present today. Although scattered, they all still hold strong their roles as moderators and take part in as many of the annual events.

References

External links
 Iranian Tourism Organization web page
 

1873 births
1973 deaths
Iranian philanthropists
People from Mashhad
Iranian centenarians
Men centenarians
Iranian book and manuscript collectors